The Murray Bushrangers is an Australian rules football team playing in Victorian statewide under-18s competition, presently known as the NAB League, since 1993 based in Wangaratta. The team trains on Norm Minns Oval. The team is coached by Mark Brown. Guernsey colours are Black, Purple and Yellow, with black socks and black (home) or white (away) shorts.

The Bushrangers have produced some of the current elite Australian Football League players through the AFL Draft including Daniel Cross, Brett Deledio, Steele Sidebottom, Steve Johnson, Jarrad Waite, Kayne Pettifer, Justin Koschitzke, Hamish McIntosh, Barry Hall, Fraser Gehrig, Ben Mathews, Steven King, Robert Campbell, Alipate Carlile, David Mundy, Shannon Byrnes & Laitham Vandermeer

Club history
Murray Bushrangers are based at Wangaratta, near the Victoria-NSW border and have been involved in the competition since 1993 when the competition added another four country teams.

Murray lost in the 2007 TAC Cup Grand Final to the Calder Cannons by 50 points, the only TAC Team of the Year representative for the year was Ben McEvoy. 2008 saw the Bushrangers dominate the entire competition season finishing 1st at season end and defeating the Dandenong Stingrays by 81 points in the 2008 grand final, midfielder-forward Steele Sidebottom had a game-high 32 possessions and kicked 10.3 claiming best on ground honours.

Draftees

Draftees

1993: Fraser Gehrig, Phil Lewis
1994: Joel Smith, Shane Sikora, Adem Yze, Shaun Gordon
1995: Adam Houlihan, Steven King, Luke Trew, Leigh Marshall, Andrew Lamb, Ben Mathews, Barry Hall
1996: Rory Hilton, Hayden Lamaro, Ben Parker
1997: Joel Mckay, Brad Stephens, Joshua Robertson
1998: Murray Vance, Aaron Henneman, Ricky Symes, Chris Lamb, Michael Stevens, Derek Murray
1999: Josh Fraser, Adam Butler, Andrew Mills, Robert Forster-Knight, Ryan Houlihan, Matthew Shir, Adam Matthews
2000: Justin Koschitzke, Kayne Pettifer, Blake Campbell, Allan Murray, Chris Hyde, Sean O'Keeffe, Daniel Cross, Marc Bullen, Luke Hammond, Robert Campbell, Craig Ednie
2001: Steve Johnson, Mark Powell, Simon O'Keefe, Justin Davies, Mark McGough, Jarrad Waite, Josh Houlihan
2002: Hamish McIntosh, Luke Mullins
2003: Kane Tenace, Ryley Dunn, David Mundy
2004: Brett Deledio, Chris Egan, Michael Newton
2005: Marcus Drum, Beau Muston, Alipate Carlile
2006: Ben Reid
2007: Ben McEvoy, Dawson Simpson
2008: Jack Ziebell, Steele Sidebottom, Sam Wright, Caleb Tiller, Tom Rockliff, Andrew Browne
2009: Sam Reid, Brayden Norris, Taylor Duryea, Dylan McNeil
2010: Shaun Atley, Josh Mellington
2011: Patrick Wearden, Lachlan Smith, Jack Crisp
2012: Tom Clurey, Josh Prudden, Matt Taberner, Cadeyn Williams
2013: Jarman Impey, Nick Holman, Max King
2014: Caleb Marchbank, Daniel Howe, Nathan Drummond, Dougal Howard
2015: Josh Schache, Clayton Oliver, Mitch King
2016: Will Brodie, Jy Simpkin, Todd Marshall, Esava Ratugolea, Lachlan Tiziani, Ryan Garthwaite, Harry Morrison, Zach Sproule, James Cousins, Max Lynch
2017: Charlie Spargo, Ben Paton, Harry Jones, Doulton Langlands
2018: Ely Smith, Laitham Vandermeer, Jacob Koschitzke, Mathew Walker, Finbar O'Dwyer, Jordon Butts
2019: Lachlan Ash
2020: Elijah Hollands, Dominic Bedendo

Statistical Record

Premierships (2):    1998, 2008
Runners-up (3):    2003, 2007, 2016
Wooden Spoons: Nil
Morrish Medallist:    Derek Murray (1997), Farran Priest (2008) Clayton Oliver (2015)
Games Record Holder:    Derek Murray (48 games)
Goals Record Holer:    Adam Prior (85 Goals)
TAC CUP Coach Award Winners:    -
Grand Final Best On Ground Medalist:    Michael Stevens (1998), Steele Sidebottom (2008)

Team of the Year players

1993:     Fraser Gehrig
1994:     Joel Smith
1995:     Jason Sheather, Barry Hall
1996:     Hayden Lamaro
1997:     Matthew Hyde, Heath Younie, Derek Murray
1998:     Chris Lamb, Derek Murray
1999:     Craig Ednie, Josh Fraser, David Teague
2000:     Craig Ednie, Justin Koschitzke, Sean O'Keefe
2001:     Mark McGough, Steve Johnson, Justin Davies
2002:     Corey Brown, Hamish McIntosh
2003:     Kane Tenace, Ryley Dunn, Lance Oswald
2004:     Marcus Drum, Brett Deledio
2005:     Tim Looby, Marcus Drum
2006:     -
2007:     Ben McEvoy 
2008:     Jack Ziebell, Tom Rockliff, Kade Klemke
2009:     Dylan McNeil
2010:     Shaun Atley, Anthony Miles
2011:     Jack Crisp
2012:     Tom Clurey
2013:     Michael Gibbons, Nick Holman
2014:     Daniel Howe, Nathan Drummond
2015:     Josh Schache, Clayton Oliver, Nick Coughlan
2016:     Will Brodie, James Cousins

Notes

External links

Official Tac Cup Website

NAB League clubs
1993 establishments in Australia

Australian rules football clubs in Victoria (Australia)
NAB League Girls clubs
Sport in Wangaratta
Australian rules football clubs established in 1993